Salles-Courbatiès is a railway station in Salles-Courbatiès, Occitanie, France. The station is on the Brive-Toulouse (via Capdenac) line. The station is served by TER (local) services operated by SNCF.

Train services
The following services currently call at Salles-Courbatiès:
Local service (TER Occitanie) Toulouse–Figeac–Aurillac

References

Railway stations in Aveyron